This is the list of administration and cabinet members under the presidency of Bongbong Marcos.

Administration and cabinet

Changes

2022

2023

Notes

References

Presidency of Bongbong Marcos